The national federations of the UCI form confederations by continent.

In Africa, this body is the Confédération Africaine de Cyclisme (the African Cycling Confederation), also shortened to CAC. It is headquartered in Cairo.

Member federations

As of September 2021, the CAC consists of 54 member federations.

References

External links
 CAC official website

Cycle racing organizations
Union Cycliste Internationale
Sports governing bodies in Africa